Tikapur Airport  is a domestic airport located in Tikapur serving Kailali District, a district in Sudurpashchim Province in Nepal.

History
The airport began operations on 11 October 1984. It served as a hub in western Nepal, as road connections were lacking until the Nepalese Civil War, when operations came to a halt in 1997. The area was then occupied by Kamaiya people, who built shelter within the airports boundaries.

In the late 2010s, the public urged for the airport to reopen, for which minister Prem Bahadur Ale vowed to reopen the airport in 2022.

Facilities

Airlines and destinations
Currently, there are no scheduled services to and from Tikapur Airport.

References

Airports in Nepal
1984 establishments in Nepal
Buildings and structures in Kailali District